Frosses is a small village in County Donegal, Ireland. The local Catholic Church is St. Mary's, located on the main street.

History
The name of the village is said to come from the Irish for "showers", which refers to food that fell from the sky and saved locals during the famine.
The first chapel in the village was reportedly built in 1780, and completed in 1808. The bell tower was added to the church in 1892.

Amenities
The village contains a community hall, a montessori, grocery shop, hairdressers, coffee stall, printing shop, and a restaurant and B&B.

Transport
The village is served by the 490 bus.

Notable people
Mary Coughlan, former Tánaiste, has lived in Frosses.

See also
 List of populated places in Ireland

References

Towns and villages in County Donegal